Henry II (1103–1123) was the Margrave of Meissen and the Saxon Ostmark (as Lusizensis marchio: margrave of Lusatia) from his birth until his death. He was the posthumous son of Margrave Henry I and Gertrude of Brunswick, daughter of Egbert I of Meissen. He was by inheritance also Count of Eilenburg. He was the second Meissener margrave of the House of Wettin.

He was initially under the regency of first his mother and after her death in 1117 under his great uncle Thimo. He died young and without children in 1123. His lands were inherited by his half-sister Richenza of Northeim. He left a widow, Adelaide, daughter of Lothair Udo III, Margrave of the Nordmark. The succession to the marches was disputed after his death.

|-

|-

1103 births
1123 deaths
House of Wettin
Margraves of Meissen
Margraves of the Saxon Ostmark
Medieval child monarchs